Martín Aarón Ponce Camacho (born June 30, 1992) is a Mexican former professional footballer who last played as a midfielder for Real Zamora.

Career
On March 12, 2013, Ponce made his professional debut with Chivas USA against the Portland Timbers in a 3–0 loss.  He came on as a substitute for Marvin Iraheta in the 59th minute.

References

External links
Chivas USA profile

1992 births
Living people
Mexican expatriate footballers
Mexican footballers
C.D. Guadalajara footballers
Chivas USA players
Association football midfielders
People from Celaya
Expatriate soccer players in the United States
Major League Soccer players
Mexico youth international footballers
Footballers from Guanajuato